VXR is the branding for the high performance trim specification, used since 2004 for models in many of Vauxhall's car range in the United Kingdom. Holden has also used the VXR badge for some of its high-performance cars such as the Astra VXR, Insignia VXR, and the Commodore VXR.

European sourced VXR models were produced and developed by Opel Performance Center, a division of Opel. The VXR8 was produced and developed by Holden Special Vehicles. The VXR brand is closely linked to VX Racing, Vauxhall's British Touring Car Championship team, and the VXR versions of the cars are race track styled models, with high performance capabilities.

History
The VX Racing name was first used in 2003 instead of Vauxhall Motorsport, taking part in the BTCC with cars prepared by Triple 8 Race Engineering.  The VXR badge was first launched in the summer of 2004, at the British Motor Show, with enhanced consumer versions of the Monaro and VX220. In 2005, the VXR range included the Astra VXR and subsequently Zafira, Vectra, Corsa, Insignia and Meriva versions.

It was launched following discussions with the Directors (K Grice, P Marshall and N Reed) and several Regional Organisers of the Vauxhall Sports Car Club, at the time the official club for owners and enthusiasts of Vauxhall performance models to replace the GSi branding (which itself replaced the GTE label) which was previously used on top end high performance models.

Shortly after the introduction of the VXR brand, a dedicated website and discussion forum, VXRonline, was set up by the Directors of the Vauxhall Sports Car Club to provide technical assistance, advice, meetings and events for all owners and enthusiasts of the VXR models.

Former VXR models

Corsa (E) VXR

 Launched 2015
 1.6i Turbo 16v engine B16LER (uprated from previous Corsa VXR)
 
 LED running lights and bi xenon headlights
 VXR exterior and interior styling 
 Twin Remus exhaust
 Top speed of 
 17" alloys (optional 18")
 ESP stability control system
 Koni dampers
 Traction Control
 Heavily bolstered Recaro bucket seats and VXR badging
 Intellilink audio system
 Onstar
 5 second Torque Overboost when fully depressing accelerator pedal

The Corsa VXR Performance Pack adds a Drexler limited slip differential, larger Brembo brakes (330 mm over standard 305 mm) and track grade suspension with retuned Koni dampers.

Astra GTC VXR
 Only available in three door
 2.0 litre four cylinder turbo producing 
 19" alloys or 20" forged alloys
 Six speed manual transmission
 Recaro front sport seats
 Unique VXR gear knob, alloy pedals, still plates and flat bottom steering wheel
 Top speed:  (electronically limited)
 Drexler limited slip differential
 Brembo brakes
 electro hydraulic power steering

Insignia VXR
 Available in the styles of the four door saloon, five door liftback, and five door sports tourer estate.
 Six speed manual or automatic transmission
 Haldex all wheel drive
 19" wheels (20" forged 7 spoke alloy wheels optional)
 Interior features include Recaro front sport seats, VXR gear knob, alloy pedals, still plates and flat bottom steering wheel
 Navi 900 satellite navigation system
 Top speed:  (electronically limited)  (without limiter, i.e. with 'Unlimited' option)

VXR8 Bathurst S
The Bathurst S version of the VXR8 became the most powerful ever Vauxhall to be offered, when it was launched in 2009.
  producing 
 Electrically adjustable leather covered sports front seats
 Traction Control System (TCS)
 Six disc in dash CD player. MP3 compatible and Bluetooth, with eleven speakers including sub woofers
 Leather covered sports steering wheel
 Cruise control
 21" inch hand smithed g6 twin spoke alloy wheels
 Aluminium VXR badged pedals
 Top speed of 

VXR220 (2004–2005)

The VXR220 was a limited edition version of the Lotus Elise based Vauxhall VX220, with a small production run of 65 vehicles.

The VXR220 was fitted with five spoke Speedline satin black alloy wheels with 195/50R16 Yokohama A048R LTS tyres at the front and 225/45R17 Yokohama A048R LTS tyres at the back and uprated brakes with 288 mm discs.

Monaro VXR (2005–2007)

The Monaro featured a different grille, wide lower air intake and bonnet scoops, side sills with 'shark gills' and unique  alloy wheels and VXR branded brake calipers on later build numbers. It was replaced by the four door VXR8, also from Holden.

Astra VXR''' (2005–2011)
The original hot hatch Astra VXR was announced in January 2005, and went on sale in the summer of 2005. Based on the Vauxhall Astra Mark 5, it was fitted with a 2.0i turbo 16V engine (Z20LEH) producing .

Externally, it was different from the standard Astra with a central trapezoidal rear exhaust, 18" six spoke alloy wheels with 225/40R18 tyres (optional 19" ten spoke wheels), lowered and uprated suspension and VXR front fog lamps and other external styling including spoiler.

Corsa VXR

Launched mid April 2007
 1.6i Turbo 16v engine A16LER (Z16LER <2010)
 Light weight body panels
 189 brake horsepower (141 kW)
 Large front air intakes with honeycomb grilles, bulging wheel arches and ground hugging front spoiler
 Rear venturi style bumper
 Central trapezoidal exhaust
 0 to 62 mph (100 km/h) in 6.8 seconds
 Top speed of 
 17" alloys (optional 18")
 ESP stability control system
 Traction Control
 Heavily bolstered Recaro bucket seats and VXR badging
 MP3 compatible sound system
 Five second Torque Overboost when fully depressing accelerator pedal
The Corsa VXR Nurburgring Edition, released in 2011, features a reworked version of the VXR's 1.6 litre turbo engine, as well as a sports exhaust and a modified turbocharger system.

Zafira VXR (2005–2010)

The seven seat Zafira VXR compact MPV was launched at the end of 2005, and sharing the same turbocharged 2.0 four cylinder engine of the Astra VXR, producing . It could be identified by the VXR bodykit, twin trapezoidal rear exhausts and 18" alloy wheels. It was claimed as the fastest MPV in production

Vectra VXR (2005–2009)

The Vectra VXR was available in both hatchback and estate versions, fitted with 2.8i 24v V6 turbo engine and was based on the Opel Vectra OPC.

The Vectra was equipped with 18" five spoke alloy wheels with 225/45R18 tyres (optional 19" ten spoke wheels) and upgraded brakes (345 mm discs on front wheels, 292 mm on rear wheels). It was replaced by the Insignia VXR.

Meriva VXR (2006–2009)

The Meriva VXR was an unusual sporting version of the Vauxhall Meriva mini MPV. It was equipped with 17" six spoke alloy wheels and brakes of 308 mm front discs, 264 mm rear discs.

See also
Irmscher
Steinmetz Opel Tuning
Holden Special Vehicles
Opel Performance Center

References

External links

Vauxhall-VXR UK
VXR Parts

Vauxhall Motors
Official motorsports and performance division of automakers